Moruya was an electoral district of the Legislative Assembly in the Australian state of New South Wales from 1894 to 1904, named after Moruya. It was created from parts of the districts of Eden and The Shoalhaven. Its only member was William Millard, who held it for the Free Trade Party until 1904 when it was replaced by The Clyde.

Members for Moruya

Election results

References

Former electoral districts of New South Wales
Constituencies established in 1894
1894 establishments in Australia
Constituencies disestablished in 1904
1904 disestablishments in Australia